Michael Jon Widger (August 21, 1948 – March 3, 2016) was a linebacker for the Montreal Alouettes and Ottawa Rough Riders of the Canadian Football League from 1970 to 1978.

An All-American at Virginia Tech, he was a CFL All-Star four times and was a part of two Grey Cup winning victories for the Alouettes.

He was a nominee for the TSN Top 50 CFL Players list in 2006. He died in 2016, aged 67.

Notes

References

1948 births
2016 deaths
Canadian football linebackers
Montreal Alouettes players
Ottawa Rough Riders players
People from Pennsville Township, New Jersey
Players of American football from New Jersey
Virginia Tech Hokies football players